The 2015 Pan American Games torch relay was a 41-day torch run, occurring from May 30 to July 10, 2015, being held prior to the start of the Games. The relay brought the torch from Mexico to the Pan American Ceremonies Venue for the opening ceremony.

An application period for Canadians to carry the torch opened in October 2014 and continued till December. Anyone aged 13 or older as of May 30, 2015 was eligible to become a torchbearer. Most of the torchbearers were selected by a random selection, while the others were selected by torch relay communities and games partners.

The torch took a 41-day journey after being lit in May 2015 at the pyramids of Teotihuacan, Mexico. The torch was brought through a total of 130 communities, mostly in Ontario (with five outside the province, Richmond, Winnipeg, Calgary, Halifax and Montreal). The relay began on May 30, 2015 in Toronto and finished on July 10, the date of the opening ceremony.

The detailed torch relay route and celebration sites were announced on February 24, 2015. The torch arrived in Toronto and then headed to Thunder Bay, before visiting all other communities on the route. The relay also visited five National Historic Sites of Canada, six Canadian Forces bases and one provincial park. There were 180 celebrations across the torch relay route.

Route

All cities in the Province of Ontario, unless otherwise noted in italics.

See also
 2015 Parapan American Games torch relay

References

External links
Official website

2015 Pan American Games
Pan American Games torch relays